"Can't Keep My Hands Off You" is a promotional single (and in some countries released as the first single) from Simple Plan's fourth studio album, Get Your Heart On!. The song features Weezer frontman Rivers Cuomo as a guest vocalist, and was released as a radio single on March 31, 2011, and an iTunes single on April 19, 2011. A music video was released on April 20, 2011. It was the band's first single in three years since their last single, "Save You", was released in 2008. An alternate version without Cuomo can be found on the soundtrack to the 2011 film Prom. The song was released as the second single in Australia in August 2011 and received frequent airplay.

Promotion 
The band performed the song on the Australian version of The X Factor on October 4, 2011.

Chart performance 
The song debuted and peaked at 45 on the Australian ARIA Singles Chart on October 24, 2011. In Canada, it reached number 70 on the Canadian Hot 100.

Music video 
A music video was shot in early April and released on April 20, 2011. The video features the band taking over a high school prom and playing outside the high school while all the students dance and cheer them. Rivers Cuomo of Weezer, who provides guest vocals on the song, is not featured in the video.

Track listing 
 "Can't Keep My Hands Off You" – 3:21

Charts

References

2011 singles
2011 songs
Simple Plan songs
Lava Records singles
Rivers Cuomo songs
Songs written by Chuck Comeau
Songs written by Pierre Bouvier
Songs written by Rivers Cuomo